Hugo Wilcken is a Paris-based, Australian-born writer and translator. His works focus on themes of existentialism and ambiguity.

Works

Fiction 
The Reflection, 
Colony 
The Execution

Nonfiction 
David Bowie's Low (33 1/3)

References

Living people
Australian male novelists
Year of birth missing (living people)